The 1969–70 Ranji Trophy was the 36th season of the Ranji Trophy. Bombay retained the title defeating Rajasthan in the final.

Group stage

South Zone

Central Zone

North Zone

West Zone

East Zone

Knockout stage

Final

Scorecards and averages
Cricketarchive

References

External links

1970 in Indian cricket
Domestic cricket competitions in 1969–70
Ranji Trophy seasons